Tantalus Fossae is a group of troughs in the Arcadia quadrangle of Mars, located at 50.9° north latitude and 97.5° west longitude.  They are about 2,400 km long and was named after an albedo feature  at 35N, 110W.  Troughs like this one are called fossae on Mars.

References

Valleys and canyons on Mars
Arcadia quadrangle